Ashleigh Nelson  (born 20 February 1991) is an English sprinter who specialises in the 100 metres. Her older brother Alexander was also a sprinter at international level as they both were selected to represent Great Britain at the 2008 Beijing Olympics.

She won a bronze medal in the 100 metres and a gold medal in the 4 × 100 m relay at the 2014 European Championships. In the 4 × 100 metres relay, she also won a bronze medal at the 2013 World Championships and a silver medal at the 2019 World Championships. Her personal bests are 11.19 secs (2014) in the 100 m and 22.85 secs (2019) in the 200 m.

Nelson was born in Stoke-on-Trent and is a cousin of footballer Curtis Nelson.

References

External links
 
 
 
 
 
 
 
 
 
 

1991 births
Living people
English female sprinters
British female sprinters
Commonwealth Games bronze medallists for England
Commonwealth Games medallists in athletics
Athletes (track and field) at the 2014 Commonwealth Games
World Athletics Championships athletes for Great Britain
World Athletics Championships medalists
European Athletics Championships winners
European Athletics Championships medalists
British Athletics Championships winners
Sportspeople from Stoke-on-Trent
Medallists at the 2014 Commonwealth Games